Steroid 15beta-monooxygenase (cytochrome P-450meg, cytochrome P450meg, steroid 15beta-hydroxylase, CYP106A2, BmCYP106A2) is an enzyme with systematic name progesterone,reduced-ferredoxin:oxygen oxidoreductase (15beta-hydroxylating) . This enzyme catalyses the following chemical reaction

 progesterone + reduced ferredoxin + O2   15beta-hydroxyprogesterone + oxidized ferredoxin + H2O

The enzyme from Bacillus megaterium hydroxylates a variety of 3-oxo-Delta4-steroids in position 15beta.

References

External links 
 

EC 1.14.15